Lisa Gelobter (born 1971) is a computer scientist, technologist and chief executive. She was the Chief Digital Service Officer for the United States Department of Education. 

In 2006, Gelobter founded and took on the role of Chief Executive Officer of tEQuitable, a start-up that provides an independent and confidential platform to address issues of bias, harassment, and discrimination in the workplace. She raised more than $2 million for tEQuitable, becoming one of the only thirty-four Black women to ever raise $1 million or more in venture capital.

Personal life 

Her father was Jewish and from Poland, and her mother was African - American and from the Caribbean. She graduated from Brown University in 1991 at the age of 20 with a computer science degree with a concentration in artificial intelligence and machine learning.

Career 

Gelobter has an expansive background in strategy development, business operations, user-centered design, product management, and engineering.

She served as Chief Digital Service Officer for the United States Department of Education during the Presidency of Barack Obama. In the position, she helped to improve HealthCare.gov, reducing the number of individual pages and overall application time. She led the team that built the United States Department of Education College Scorecard, which helped college students make sensible choices about college investments. She is on the advisory board of Bridge Foundry. 

Prior to public service, Gelobter was the Chief Digital Officer for BET Networks and was a member of the senior management team for the launch of Hulu. She also worked on Shockwave, a multimedia platform used for video games. She was instrumental in the creation of Shockwave and oversaw the product release cycle for Shockwave, coded ActiveX control for the player, coordinated the engineering transition among many other things.

In 2016, Gelobter founded tEquitable, an independent, confidential platform to address issues of bias, discrimination and harassment in the workplace. She raised more than $2 million for the platform.

She is also a former member of the New York Urban League STEM Advisory Board.   and was named one of Fast Company’s Most Creative People.

References

1971 births
Living people
Internet pioneers
American women chief executives
American women computer scientists
American computer scientists
Women Internet pioneers
Brown University alumni
21st-century American women